Cooley v. Board of Wardens, 53 U.S. (12 How.) 299 (1852), was a US Supreme Court case that held that a Pennsylvania law requiring all ships entering or leaving Philadelphia to hire a local pilot did not violate the Commerce Clause of the Constitution. Those who did not comply with the law had been required to pay a fee. Benjamin R. Curtis wrote for the majority, "It is the opinion of a majority of the court that the mere grant to Congress of the power to regulate commerce, did not deprive the States of power to regulate pilots, and that although Congress had legislated on this subject, its legislation manifests an intention, with a single exception, not to regulate this subject, but to leave its regulation to the several states."

Legal historian Charles W. McCurdy viewed Cooley as a defining case which clarified the Court's hitherto contradictory jurisprudence on state powers over interstate commerce.

See also
 List of United States Supreme Court cases, volume 53
 Tenth Amendment to the United States Constitution

References

External links

 
Summary of Cooley v. Board of Wardens

1852 in United States case law
United States Constitution Article One case law
United States Supreme Court cases
United States Supreme Court cases of the Taney Court
United States Dormant Commerce Clause case law
Water transportation in Pennsylvania
1852 in Pennsylvania
History of Philadelphia